Edmonton West is a federal electoral district in Alberta, Canada, that was represented in the House of Commons of Canada from 1917 to 1988, from 1997 to 2004 and again since 2015.

Demographics

History and geography
This riding was first created in 1914 from Edmonton riding.  Originally this was vast rural district including most of the northwestern quadrant of the province of Alberta and a portion of the city of Edmonton, the area north of the river and west of 101st Street.  

In 1924, it took in parts of the now-abolished Strathcona riding that had been within Edmonton city limits. It took in the southside area lying west of 103rd Street.

In 1924 the northern rural sections were also separated to form the ridings of Peace River and Athabasca. 

In 1933 the more southerly portions became Jasper—Edson. The areas nearer the city became Pembina in 1966.

The urban part of riding similarly shrank over time as Edmonton's population expanded and new districts were spun off from Edmonton West.  Parts of Edmonton West were lost to Edmonton—Strathcona (1952), Edmonton Centre (first time 1966), Edmonton North, (1976).  However it also gained area from the (temporary) abolition of  Edmonton Centre in 1976.

Edmonton West was abolished in 1987 when it was redistributed into Edmonton Northwest and Edmonton Southwest ridings.  It was re-created in 1996 from Edmonton Northwest, Edmonton Southwest ridings.

Edmonton West was abolished again in 2003 and transferred mostly into Edmonton Centre, with a smaller portion going into Edmonton—Spruce Grove. It was recreated by the Canadian federal electoral redistribution, 2012 from parts of Edmonton—Spruce Grove and Edmonton Centre.

Members of Parliament
This riding has elected the following members of the House of Commons of Canada:

Election results

2015–present

1997–2004

1917–1988

See also
 Edmonton West Provincial electoral district
 List of Canadian federal electoral districts
 Past Canadian electoral districts

References

External links
 
 
 Expenditures - 2000
 Expenditures - 1997
 Elections Canada
 Website of the Parliament of Canada

Alberta federal electoral districts
Politics of Edmonton